Galeta is a surname. Notable people with the surname include:

Hotep Idris Galeta (1941–2010), South African jazz pianist and educator
Ivan Ladislav Galeta (1947–2014), Croatian artist, cinematographer, and film director

See also
Galeta Island (disambiguation)